is a railway station on the Tadami Line in the town of Tadami, Minamiaizu District, Fukushima Prefecture, Japan, operated by East Japan Railway Company (JR East).

Lines

Station layout
Tadami Station has a single island platform connected to the station building by a level crossing.

Platforms

History
The station was absorbed into the JR East network upon the privatization of the JNR on April 1, 1987. 

Due to damage caused by torrential rainfall on July 30, 2011, services between Tadami and Aizu-Kawaguchi stations were replaced by a provisional bus service. The closed section resumed operations on 1 October 2022.

Passenger statistics
In fiscal 2017, the station was used by an average of 22 passengers daily (boarding passengers only).

Surrounding area
Tadami Town Hall
Tadami Post Office
Tadami River

Bus routes
Shizen Shuto・Tadami
Tadami Station - Toki no Sato YURARI - Aizu Tadami Archaeological Museum - Kobayashi Snow Station - Minami Aizu Hospital - Aizu-Tajima Station
A flat rate of fares at 200 yen when use in Tadami. Fares costs 1500 yen to ride on between Minami-Aizu Town and Tadami Town.

See also
 List of railway stations in Japan

References

External links

 JR East Station information 

Railway stations in Fukushima Prefecture
Tadami Line
Railway stations in Japan opened in 1963
Stations of East Japan Railway Company
Tadami, Fukushima